Pict or PICT may refer to:

 Picts, a group of Late Iron Age and Early Medieval Celtic people living in eastern and northern Scotland.
 Picts (Conan), inhabitants of the Pictish Wilderness, a region in the fictional world of Conan the Barbarian
 Pict (programming language), a statically typed programming language based on the π-calculus.
 PICT, a graphics file format introduced on the original Apple Macintosh computer as its standard metafile format.
 Parliamentary Information and Communication Technology Service
 Pittsburgh Irish and Classical Theatre
 Pollution-induced community tolerance
 Pune Institute of Computer Technology
 Pakistan International Container Terminal

See also 
 Several Species of Small Furry Animals Gathered Together in a Cave and Grooving with a Pict, a Pink Floyd track
 Pictones, a Gallic tribe dwelling south of the Loire river